is a 2017 Japanese animated action fantasy film based on the Pretty Cure franchise created by Toei Company (under the name of "Izumi Todo"). The film is directed by Hiroshi Miyamoto, written by Fumi Tsubota and produced by Toei Animation. The film was released in Japanese theaters on March 18, 2017.

Marking the ninth entry to the Pretty Cure All Stars crossover film series, the Kirakira Pretty Cure a la Mode team joins Witchy PreCure! and Go! Princess PreCure teams, as they assist a girl named Sakura trying to rescue her friend, Shizuku. It also marks the first film in the crossover serial to not be titled All Stars. The motif of the film is based on Japanese mythology, with wa as the main theme of the film.

Plot
After school, Ichika meets up with her friends and they talk about her dream, where Sakura and Shizuku run from Akainu and Kiinu through a cherry blossom forest, and Ichika and Pekorin go towards a hill and sets up a picnic next to a tree stump. She spots the girl from her dream, Sakura, who tries to take Ichika's cupcake, noticing there is a pastry on one of the three cards Shizuku gave her. Ichika is confused and they are argue, before Akainu appears and attacks them.

Ichika transforms into Cure Whip to fight Akainu, which makes Sakura realize that the cards' purpose is to search for the Pretty Cure represented by the item on the card. After an overpowered Cure Whip hides, Sakura wishes she was able to aid Cure Whip. The miracle light glows and glows a door Sakura goes through, where she briefly instructs the audience on the Miracle Lights. The others arrive and revert Akainu back into the origami form. After an explanation, the girls consider that what happens to Sakuragahara affects the cherry blossoms in their world, and they discuss on how to find the Cures of the Keys and of the Jewels.

Ichika, Himari and Aoi go to the Magical World where they inspect Mofurun due to her jewel with the symbol of the cards on it. When they land in the heart of the shopping district, a Yokubaru starts attacking. The Mahou Girls transform and are having trouble. They are thrown away by the Yokubaru. Sakura helps take Ichika, Himari, and Aoi to Ichigozaka. Yukari and Akira go to Noble Academy where the latter intimidates Yur Nanase trying to get keys off of her. The Princess Pretty Cures show up to confront Akira, before they transform and throw a Zetsuborg into the air and Sakura teleports them to the landing area, where the combined Cure teams are able to beat the monsters. Later, a mysterious girl named Samidare pins down the transformation devices and tries to hit Sakura, but she can't bring herself to so she retreats.

At the KiraKira Patisserie to eat dinner and dessert, Sakura is saddened by watching the Cures interact and remembers Shizuku, and Ichika follows after her after seeing her leave. Sakura tells Ichika her story with Shizuku and their promise to see the cherry blossoms bloom. Ichika then says that tears and sadness causes happy moments to be sweeter. The Miracle Light glows and forms a door at the tree stump, which Sakura opens for the Cures to enter Sakuragahara.

When they arrive, they are met by Akainu and Kiinu, who both merge into Ooinu, and Karasu Tengu greets Sakura and says that they wanted to own her ability to open portals so they can travel to different worlds. The Cures try to pin down Ooinu, but this is proven difficult. The Cures, except Cure Flora because she was stuck in a tree, grab onto the floating stones around Ooinu's head. Ooinu spins the stones in hopes of shaking them off. This ends up sending the Cures and Ooinu flying through the air. Ooinu crashes while the Cures land safely. Samidare appears and turns most of the Cures into origami except Whip and Sakura who try to escape, but Samidare jumps to the top of the torii path, leaving them with no choice but to fight back. Whip uses her hearing to trace Samidare's attack, and upon hearing her positioning her right foot to throw her crane, Whip leaps up and kick Samidare, shattering half of her mask. The injured Samidare opens her eye, which Sakura recognizes as Shizuku's, and she is shocked over the fact that Shizuku is now evil. Karasu Tengu arrives to mock them and attempts to control Samidare again, but Whip attacks Karasu Tengu before they could do anything. Their spell causes the weather to change to rain. As it pours, Whip is still determined to save Shizuku and tries to get Sakura to join her, but she still feels depressed over how she doesn't remember her anymore. However, Whip encourages her, but before anything is done, Karasu Tengu attacks Whip and sends her crashing into the mud. Karasu Tengu then proceeds to taunt her, but a determined Whip stands up and vows to help her family and friends.

Her declaration causes the Miracle Sakulight to glow and return Sakuragahara to normal. Sakura takes this opportunity to pounce on top of Samidare and try to get her to remember her true form as Shizuku. When she gets through to her, the second half of the mask shatters and Shizuku returns. In addition to that, the other Pretty Cure have been turned back to normal, and Karasu Tengu turns into their powered-up form.

As the Cures get ready to fight Karasu Tengu, Sakura and Shizuku meet up with them, and the latter tells the group that she has a plan, leading Whip to call a one-minute timeout. During that time, they discuss the plan and once they were done, Whip and Sakura tell the audience to support them using the Miracle Lights. After that, they begin their attack, with the Cures charging at Karasu Tengu, and Sakura and Shizuku running down the torii path. The Princess and Mahou Tsukai Cures attack first, followed by the KiraKira Cures, who use the Goldfish Daifuku Animal Sweet to produce a giant fist of Kirakiraru to strike Karasu Tengu. When that is not enough, the other Cures arrive to lend their support.

As Sakura and Shizuku run down the torii path, Sakura recalls taking it with Shizuku back when she was scared, but now that she has encountered the Cures, she has become braver. After Sakura took a moment to catch her breath, she makes it to the door and uses the Miracle Saku Light to open it. Meanwhile, all of the Cures are now guiding a giant form of Whip made of Kirakiraru. Whip is afraid at first because the form's arms were too short, but when Karasu Tengu attacks, her massive hair blocks the hit instead. Just then, Sakura and Shizuku appear through a portal above them and they attack Karasu Tengu themselves.

Karasu Tengu tries to fend the two off, but Shizuku is able to bite a weak spot, the nose, and it causes Karasu Tengu to revert to their normal form. This gives the Cures the opportunity to attack and they collide with Karasu Tengu in an explosion of fireworks, defeating the mountain spirit once and for all. After the battle, the Cures, along with Sakura and Shizuku, have their flower viewing, with them all interacting with each other.

During the viewing, Whip thinks about trying to become stronger and braver by herself, and it didn't turn out well, but when she tried it with her friends, it started to work. Whip then tells Sakura that she helped make her dream of viewing the flowers with all of her friends come true and thanked her for it.

Characters

Kirakira Pretty Cure a la Mode 

 Ichika Usami / Cure Whip (Karen Miyama)
 Himari Arisugawa / Cure Custard (Haruka Fukuhara)
 Aoi Tategami  / Cure Gelato (Tomo Muranaka)
 Yukari Kotozume / Cure Macaron (Saki Fujita)
 Akira Kenjo / Cure Chocolat (Nanako Mori)
 Pekorin (Mika Kanai)

Witchy PreCure! 

 Mirai Asahina / Cure Miracle (Rie Takahashi)
 Riko Izayoi / Cure Magical (Yui Horie)
 Kotoha Hanami / Cure Felice (Saori Hayami)
 Mofurun (Ayaka Saitō)
 Headmaster (Yūya Uchida)
 Head Teacher (Yoshino Ohtori)
 Gustav (Masafumi Kimura)
 Todd (Yuto Suzuki)

Go! Princess PreCure 

 Haruka Haruno / Cure Flora (Yū Shimamura)
 Minami Kaido / Cure Mermaid (Masumi Asano)
 Kirara Amanogawa / Cure Twinkle (Hibiku Yamamura)
 Towa Akagi / Cure Scarlet (Miyuki Sawashiro)
 Pafu (Nao Tōyama)
 Aroma (Shiho Kokido)
 Yui Nanase (Haruka Yoshimura)
 Hitomi Segawa (Arisa Kiyoto)
 Yoko Kanda (Haruno Inoue)
 Hanae Komori (Haruka Chisuga)
 Riko Furuya (Kana Ueda)
 Sayaka Kano (Nao Tōyama, uncredited)
 Noble Academy schoolgirl (Rie Takahashi, uncredited)

Film characters
She searches for the Pretty Cures so she can reclaim her world from Karasutengu and rescue Shizuku. Himari almost mistook Sakura as a goldfish.
She was captured by Karasutengu when Sakura is escaping to the Human World and brainwashed to serve him. After being brainwashed, she becomes a human named  with blue fox ears and tail and wears a Kitsune Mask. She is well skilled in fighting and is very strong until Whip defeated her. She has a power to turn her enemies into origami.
He has mind control abilities and views Sakura and the Pretty Cures as a threat. He has a habit of cracking up jokes.

Production
The film was announced after the screening of Witchy Pretty Cure! The Movie: Wonderous! Cure Mofurun!, with the official website opened at October 29, 2016. The film is hinted as a film that is "not an All Stars" film and will start a fresh new storyline away from the previous crossover series. Similar to All Stars, the film is a non-canonical crossover between series, specifically Go! Princess PreCure, Witchy PreCure! and  Kirakira Pretty Cure a la Mode alongside two new characters made for the film. In addition, producer Takashi Washio stated that only three current Pretty Cure teams will be used due to the film's focus on the most current generation teams rather than relying on using the previous generation, a problem encountered while producing the All Stars movies.

In addition of the film being animated in traditional animation, the film also featured 3D Cel-Shaded backgrounds and animation, similar to what was shown in Go! Princess PreCure the Movie: Splendid! Triple Feature! The 3D scenes in the film were modeled closely to Japanese shrines and locations to give a more distinct feel than the previous films. While discussing the film's theme, Washio said Japanese mythology and the term  were chosen, which he stated was a very difficult theme to work with due to concerns that "it may distance the film away from children". However, its theme can also reveal the beauty and depth of Japanese culture, and hopefully it will be received well with children, alongside other themes from previous films. The movie also shares similarities with Kado: the Right Answer. Another Toei CGI Anime with same animation style from Dream Stars!.

Music
The film's score was composed by Yuki Hayashi. The film's opening theme is titled  by Rie Kitagawa while the ending song is titled  by Yoshino Kimura.

The single charted at #58 in the Oricon Singles Chart and #63 in the Billboard Japan Top Singles Sales chart

Release and promotion
The film debuted in Japanese theaters on March 18, 2017. Moviegoers were given a "Miracle Sakulight" for participation. To promote the film, animal sweets were distributed to those that preorded the movie tickets.

Kimura appeared on Music Station performing "Kimi o Yobu Basho", described as a "medium tempo ballad" by Oricon; this was her first appearance on the program in sixteen years

Reception
The movie debuted at 5th place on its opening weekend on March 18–19, beating Kuroko's Basketball The Movie: Last Game which debuted at the same week. On its opening week, it earned a total of 158 million yen on 135,000 audience admissions. It later fell to 10th place. Toei's sales target of the film is 700 million yen. The film received a 92.0 rating from Pia's first-day satisfaction survey, ranking at third place. By March 25–26, it drops to 10th place.

References

External links
  
 

2017 anime films
2010s Japanese films
Crossover anime and manga
Pretty Cure films
2010s Japanese-language films
Japanese magical girl films
Works about tengu
Films scored by Yuki Hayashi